Gorostiza is an Hispanic surname.

People 
 José Gorostiza (1901–1973), Mexican poet, educator, and diplomat
 Celestino Gorostiza (1904–1967), Mexican playwright and dramatist
 Guillermo Gorostiza (1909–1966), Spanish footballer
 Carlos Gorostiza (1920–2016), Argentine playwright, theatre director and novelist
 Anndrew Blythe Daguio Gorostiza (born 2003), Filipina actress, model, and recording artist